Balparmak tatlısı (Honey finger dessert)(Turkish: Balparmak tatlısı), is a type of Turkish dessert. Balparmak tatlısı is a Turkish dessert similar to kalburabastı and Vizier's fingers.

See also
Şekerpare
Revani
Baklava
Tulumba

References

Turkish desserts